Iberus marmoratus, commonly named cabrilla de sierra, is a species of air-breathing land snail, a terrestrial pulmonate gastropod mollusk in the family Helicidae, the typical snails. It is endemic to southern Spain.

Subspecies 
Subspecies of Iberus marmoratus include:
Iberus marmoratus alcarazanus
Iberus marmoratus cobosi Ibáñez & Alonso, 1978
Iberus marmoratus guiraoanus
Iberus marmoratus loxanus (A. Schmidt, 1853)
Iberus marmoratus marmoratus (A. Férussac, 1821)
Iberus marmoratus rositai de Fez, 1950

References

External links 

marmoratus
Gastropods described in 1821

Endemic fauna of Spain
Endemic molluscs of the Iberian Peninsula